The 2016 American Samoa Democratic presidential caucuses took place on March 1 in the U.S. territory of American Samoa as one of the Democratic Party's primaries ahead of the 2016 presidential election.

On the same day, dubbed "Super Tuesday," Democratic primaries were held in eleven other states, while the Republican Party held primaries in eleven states as well. The Republican Party's American Samoa caucus was held on March 22, 2016.

Results

Primary date: March 1, 2016
National delegates: 11

References

American Samoa
Democratic caucus
2016
March 2016 events in the United States